Timothy is an unincorporated community in Overton County, Tennessee, United States. It is concentrated around the intersection of State Route 52 and State Route 136 between Livingston and Celina, and lies just north of Standing Stone State Park. The community was named for an early postmaster, Timothy Stephens.

References

Unincorporated communities in Overton County, Tennessee
Unincorporated communities in Tennessee